Ramin (also Romanized as Ramīn; also known as Ramīn-e Bālā) is a village in Kambel-e Soleyman Rural District, in the Central District of Chabahar County, Sistan and Baluchestan Province, Iran. At the 2006 census, its population was 3,615, in 694 families.

References 

Populated places in Chabahar County